is a Japanese manga artist born in 1969. She debuted in 1990 with Next to an Angel published by Akita Shoten. Her other works include Fake, By the Sword, and Black x Blood.   She taught Kazuma Kodaka, the author of Kizuna: Bonds of Love, shoujo manga drawing techniques.

Works

References

External links
  
 
 Sanami Matoh manga at Media Arts Database 

Japanese female comics artists
1969 births
20th-century Japanese women writers
21st-century Japanese women writers
Female comics writers
Women manga artists
Living people
Manga artists from Ōita Prefecture